Graves Creek is a stream in the U.S. state of Montana. It is a tributary to South Fork Flathead River within an impoundment of the same river.

Course
Graves Creek rises about 1 mile [CONVERT] east of Black Lake in Flathead County, Montana, and then flows generally east and southeast to join South Fork Flathead River about 10 miles east of Mud Lake.

Watershed
Graves Creek drains  of area, receives about 59.2 in/year [CONVERT] of precipitation, and is about 76.83% forested.

See also 
 List of rivers of Montana

References

Rivers of Montana
Rivers of Flathead County, Montana